Money to Burn is a 1926 American silent drama film directed by Walter Lang. The film survives in the archives of the Library of Congress and the Museum of Modern Art.

Cast
 Malcolm McGregor as Dan Stone
 Dorothy Devore as Dolores Valdez
 Eric Mayne as Don Diego Valdez
 Nina Romano as Maria González
 George Chesebro as Manuel Ortego
 Orfa Casanova as Señora Sanguinetti
 Jules Cowles as The Giant
 John T. Prince as Bascom
 Arnold Melvin as The Mysterious Native

References

External links
 

1926 films
1926 drama films
Silent American drama films
American silent feature films
1920s English-language films
American black-and-white films
Films directed by Walter Lang
Gotham Pictures films
1920s American films